Stanley Atani, is a Tahitian footballer who plays for AS Vénus Mahina and for the Tahiti national football team.

International goals
Scores and results list Tahiti's goal tally first.

International career statistics

References

External links
Stanley Atani at playmakerstats.com (English version of ogol.com.br)

1990 births
Living people
French Polynesian footballers
Tahiti international footballers
2013 FIFA Confederations Cup players
Association football midfielders